Evija Āzace (born 9 April 1976) is a former Latvian female professional basketball player.

External links
Profile at eurobasket.com

References

1976 births
Living people
Basketball players from Riga
Latvian women's basketball players
Centers (basketball)